The Native Tour (also known as the Native Summer Tour in North America or as the Native Fall Tour in Europe) is the third headlining concert tour by American Pop rock band OneRepublic, in support of their third studio album Native (2013). OneRepublic were joined on the Native Summer leg of the tour by The Script and American Authors, and on the European "Native Fall Tour" leg by Kongos. The tour has traveled across five continents: Asia, Europe, Oceania, North America, and Africa. The tour began on April 2, 2013 in Milan, Italy and ended on September 20, 2015 in São Paulo, Brazil.

Background
The first North American leg was announced April 23, 2013.
In September 2013, the band announced Australian and New Zealand dates.
The first round for the Summer 2014 North American dates were announced in December 2013. This leg was dubbed the "Native Summer Tour". Those dates showed an influx in sales and selling out in major markets which surprised the band and promoters. This prompted to additional dates for that leg and was announced in February 2014.

Concert synopsis

The set begins with the band "in silhouette behind a white curtain before it was ripped away to revel an uncluttered set with a projection screen." The stage is designed with "diamond-shaped video screens, a multi-level stage" and a catwalk which leads to a B-stage on which the band plays on for a section of the show.

The set list includes the band's well-known songs and covers, such as "What a Wonderful World" (Louis Armstrong), "Take Me to Church" (Hozier) and "Budapest" by George Ezra and others.

Opening acts

The Script 
American Authors 
Lights 
Christina Perri 
The Makemakes 
Jamie Scott
Gangs Of Ballet 
Kongos 
The Last Internationale 
Lights 
Harel Skaat

Setlists
The setlists below are an example as it varies from date to date.

"Don't Look Down"
"Light It Up"
"Secrets"
"All the Right Moves"
"What You Wanted"
"Stop and Stare"
"Something I Need"
"Apologize"
"Preacher" 
"Come Home"
"Counting Stars"
"Can't Stop"
"Au Revoir"
"Feel Again"
"Good Life"
"I Lived"
Encore
"Love Runs Out"
"What a Wonderful World" )
"If I Lose Myself"
Source
{{hidden
| headercss = background: #778899; font-size: 100%; width: 59%;
| contentcss = text-align: left; font-size: 100%; width: 75%;
| header = North America leg 3
| content = Canada
"Don't Look Down"
"Light It Up"
"Secrets"
"All the Right Moves"
"What You Wanted"
"Stop and Stare"
"Something I Need"
"Praise You" 
"Apologize"/"Stay with Me" 
"Budapest" 
"Preacher" 
"Good Life"
Spanish Guitar Melody
"Counting Stars"
"Can't Stop"
"Au Revoir"
"Feel Again"
"I Lived"
"Love Runs Out"
"What a Wonderful World" 
"If I Lose Myself" 
Source:

}}
{{hidden
| headercss = background: #778899; font-size: 100%; width: 59%;
| contentcss = text-align: left; font-size: 100%; width: 75%;
| header = Asia leg 3
| content = Tel Aviv
"Don't Look Down"
"Light It Up"
"Secrets"
"All the Right Moves"
"Apologize"/"Stay With Me" 
"Budapest" 
"Preacher" 
"Good Life"
Spanish Guitar Melody
"Counting Stars"
"Can't Stop"
"Au Revoir"
"Feel Again"
"Love Runs Out"
"What a Wonderful World" 
"I Lived"
"If I Lose Myself"
Source:
}}
{{hidden
| headercss = background: #778899; font-size: 100%; width: 59%;
| contentcss = text-align: left; font-size: 100%; width: 75%;
| header = Europe leg 4
| content = May 30 – June 15, 2015
"Light It Up"
"Secrets"
"All the Right Moves"
"What You Wanted"
"Stop and Stare"
"Something I Need"
"Apologize"/"Stay With Me" 
"Budapest" 
"Preacher" 
"Good Life"
Spanish Guitar Melody
"Counting Stars"
"Can't Stop"
"Au Revoir"
"Feel Again"
"Good Life"
"I Lived"
Encore
"Love Runs Out"
"What a Wonderful World" 
"If I Lose Myself"

Source:
}}

Tour dates

Cancelled shows

Personnel
Band
Ryan Tedder — Lead vocals, piano, acoustic guitar
Zach Filkins — Lead guitar, viola, acoustic guitar, tambourine, backing vocals, percussion
Drew Brown — Rhythm guitar, acoustic guitar, keyboard, glockenspiel, piano, tambourine, backing vocals 
Eddie Fisher — Drums, percussion
Brent Kutzle — Bass guitar, cello, acoustic guitar, tambourine, backing vocals
Brian Willett — Analog synthesizer, percussion, keyboards, backing vocals

Crew
AJ Pen — Lighting director
Zito — Production manager

Broadcastings
The August 9, 2014, show in Holmdel was streamed live on Yahoo.com.
From May 30 to June 15, 2015, they streamed the show on merkaat.com during the closing song, "If I Lose Myself" and the after show backstage.  The band also released a film of their concert in Johannesburg, entitled Live In South Africa on DVD and Blu-ray.

Critical reception
Stephanie March of the Denver Posts Reverb says, "the band quickly showed why it deserved the two night sellout by transitioning with finesse into "Secrets" from "Waking Up"." Kevin C. Johnson of the St. Louis Post-Dispatch says that, "the show was nothing special, yet came off totally like able." "Early songs such as "Secrets", "All the Right Moves", "What You Wanted" and "Stop and Stare" felt a little slow to lift off but the show gained its right momentum before long." The Pittsburgh Post-Gazettes Ebony Martins' review of the show was; "If there is any chance that music exists in heaven, there's a good chance that heavens heard Ryan Tedder's a cappella falsettos Friday night at the First Niagara Pavilion." "Dressed in all black, Mr. Tedder was clearly the rock star of the night, swinging his signature fedora hat on and off during songs, bouncing on speakers, jumping on the piano for a few songs and blessing fans with his lyrical genius." Lynn Saxberg from the Ottawa Citizen says, "Fans were bedazzled by the slick production." Saxberg was happy that there was nothing to distract the band's musicianship which was "top-notch level". One highlight was during "Preacher" a song that "Tedder wrote for his grandfather." Mike Ross, of the Edmonton Sun said, OneRepublic wowed the crowd at Rexall Place and delivered. He praised front man Tedder for his powerhouse vocals, ability to play the piano, and write songs "with a catchy hook, an anthemic U2-ian chorus and some kind of empowering inspirational message". He also praised the other band members talent for playing a variety of instruments.

References

External links
OneRepublic's official website

OneRepublic concert tours
2013 concert tours
2014 concert tours
2015 concert tours
OneRepublic